Partner, Partners, The Partner, or, The Partners may refer to:

Books
The Partner (Grisham novel), by John Grisham, 1997
The Partner (Jenaro Prieto novel), 1928
The Partners (book), a 1983 book by James B. Stewart
Partner (manga), a Japanese Shōjo manga by Miho Obana

Companies and brands
Partner (Israel), an Israeli wireless telecommunications service provider
Partners the Stationer, a High Street specialist stationery retailer
Peugeot Partner, a vehicle made by the French car manufacturer Peugeot
Peugeot Partner Rapid, a rebranded version of the Brazilian Fiat Fiorino
Honda Partner, a vehicle made by Honda, also known as Honda Orthia
Partners HealthCare, a not-for-profit healthcare organization in Massachusetts

Film
, a film by Colin Campbell (director)
Partners (1916 film), a film directed by Hobart Henley
Partners (1932 film), a Western directed by Fred Allen
Partner (1968 film), an Italian film directed by Bernardo Bertolucci
Partners (1976 film), a film directed by Don Owen
Partners (1982 film), a film directed by James Burrows, starring Ryan O'Neal and John Hurt
Partner (2007 film), a Bollywood film directed by David Dhawan, starring Salman Khan and Govinda
Partner (2008 film), a Bengali film directed by Shankar Ray
Partners (2009 film), an action film set in New York City
The Partner (film), 2013 Japanese-Vietnamese television film

Television
The Partners (TV series), an American sitcom that aired on NBC in 1971–1972
The Partner (TV series), an American reality show that aired on CNBC in 2017
Partners (1995 TV series), an American sitcom that aired on Fox 1995–1996
Partners (2012 TV series), an American sitcom that aired on CBS in 2012
Partners (2014 TV series), an American sitcom that aired on FX in 2014
Partners (2017 TV series), a 2017 Indian television series
"Partners" (Spider-Man), a 1997 episode of Spider-Man: The Animated Series
"Partners" (MacGyver), a 1987 episode of the American television series MacGyver
"Partners" (Renegade), a 1992 episode of the American television series Renegade

Music
 Partner (band), Canadian indie rock band
 Partners (Scherrie & Susaye album), 1979
 Partners (Willie Nelson album), 1986
 Partners (Paul Bley & Gary Peacock album), 1991
 Partners (Flaco Jiménez album), 1992
 Partners (Barbra Streisand album), 2014

Other uses 
Partner (business rank), in law or financial firms
Partner (card game)
Partner dances, choreographed for pairs
Partner (horse), a thoroughbred racehorse born 1718 
Partners statue, depicting Walt Disney holding the hand of Mickey Mouse
Partner (surname), for people with this name

See also
Pardners, 1956 American comedy western film
Partnership
Business partner
Sexual partner
Significant other, spouse, husband, or wife
Cooperative participants in various activities:
Tennis doubles
Contract bridge